Falling Into You is a Taiwanese drama streaming television show, created for Taiwan Television and released on streaming platform Viki through its channel on Apple TV and Netflix internationally. It premiered on 19 September 2020.

Plot 
Chen Zi Tong (Puff Kuo) is down on her luck. She was once a promising taekwondo athlete with hopes of competing at the Olympic Games, but she suffered a knee injury inflicted by a scheming friend and a disloyal boyfriend that made her turn her back on her sporting ambitions. Chen still dreams of returning to competition, but has been forced to take on a job as a worker at a startup delivery company where she meets its young, successful CEO Fang Zhi Sheng (Jiro Wang). She manages to land a job at his company's head office, but Fang soon discovers she is not that interested in him. However, Fang Zhi Sheng suffers from hemophobia and is scared at the sight of blood. Slowly, the unconventional duo begins to form a bond over this disease. Fang helps encourage Chen to start rehabilitating her injury and return to training while she helps him confront his fears.

Cast 

 Puff Kuo as Chen Zi Tong
 Jiro Wang as Fang Zhi Sheng
 Desmond Tan as Chen Tian-Lin
 Peng Yuchang as Fang Qing

Release 
The series started airing on 19 September 2020 on TTV. The series is an addition to Netflix's Chinese Language Originals collection as well as part of the Viki catalogue. In Singapore, the series is available on MeWATCH and will be premiere in March 2021 on Mediacorp TV Channel 8.

References

External links 

 
 

Viki (streaming service) original programming
2020 Taiwanese television series debuts
2020 Taiwanese television series endings
Mandarin-language Netflix original programming
Taiwan Television original programming